La Pointe du Hoc is a promontory with a  cliff overlooking the English Channel on the northwestern coast of Normandy in the Calvados department, France.

In World War II, Pointe du Hoc was the location of a series of German bunkers and machine gun posts. Prior to the invasion of Normandy, the German army fortified the area with concrete casemates and gun pits. On D-Day, the United States Army Provisional Ranger Group attacked and captured Pointe du Hoc after scaling the cliffs. United States generals including Dwight D. Eisenhower had determined that the place housed artillery that could slow down nearby beach attacks.

Background

As part of the Atlantic Wall fortifications, the prominent cliff top location was fortified by the Germans.

The battery was initially built in 1943 to house six captured French First World War vintage GPF 155mm K418(f) guns positioned in open concrete gun pits. The battery was occupied by the 2nd Battery of Army Coastal Artillery Regiment 1260 (2/HKAA.1260). To defend the promontory from attack, elements of the 352nd Infantry Division were stationed at the battery.

Prelude

To provide increased defensive capability, the Germans began to improve the defenses of the battery in the spring of 1944, with enclosed H671 concrete casemates being started and the older 155mm guns displaced. The plan was to build six casemates but two were unfinished when the location was attacked. The casemates were built over and in front of the circular gun pits, which housed the 155mm guns.

Also built was a H636 observation bunker and L409a mounts for 20mm Flak 30 anti-aircraft guns. The 155mm guns would have threatened the Allied landings on Omaha and Utah beaches when finished, risking heavy casualties to the landing forces.

In the months before D-Day the Germans were recorded by Allied Intelligence removing their guns one by one as they re-developed the site with the final aim of 4 casemates facing Utah Beach and the possibility of 2 x 155mm guns in open emplacements. During the preparation for Operation Overlord it was determined by Lt Col. James Earl Rudder that Pointe du Hoc should be attacked by ground forces, to prevent the Germans using the casemates.

Recently released documents in the US Archives show that Rudder knew prior to landing that the casemates were unfinished and only two were actually structurally close to being ready. They remain that way today. The U.S. 2nd and 5th Ranger Battalions were given the task of assaulting the strong point early on D-Day. Elements of the 2nd Battalion went in to attack Pointe du Hoc but delays meant the remainder of the 2nd Battalion and the complete 5th Battalion landed at Omaha Beach as their secondary landing position.

Though the Germans had removed the main armament from Pointe du Hoc, the beachheads were shelled by field artillery from the nearby Maisy battery, on the fire support plan of heavy cruiser HMS Hawkins. The rediscovery of the battery at Maisy has shown that it was responsible for firing on the Allied beachheads until 9 June 1944.

Plan 

Pointe du Hoc lay within General Leonard Gerow's V Corps field of operations. This then went to the 1st Infantry Division (the Big Red One) and then down to the right-hand assault formation, the 116th Infantry Regiment attached from 29th Division. In addition they were given two Ranger battalions to undertake the attack.

The Ranger battalions were commanded by Lieutenant Colonel James Earl Rudder. The plan called for the three companies of Rangers to be landed by sea at the foot of the cliffs, scale them using ropes, ladders, and grapples while under enemy fire, and engage the enemy at the top of the cliff. This was to be carried out before the main landings. The Rangers trained for the cliff assault on the Isle of Wight, under the direction of British Commandos.

Major Cleveland A. Lytle was to command Companies D, E and F of the 2nd Ranger Battalion (known as "Force A") in the assault at Pointe du Hoc. During a briefing aboard the Landing Ship Infantry TSS Ben My Chree, he heard that French Resistance sources reported the guns had been removed. Impelled to some degree by alcohol, Lytle became quite vocal that the assault would be unnecessary and suicidal and was relieved of his command at the last minute by Provisional Ranger Force commander Rudder. Rudder felt that Lytle could not convincingly lead a force with a mission that he did not believe in. Lytle was later transferred to the 90th Infantry Division where he was awarded the Distinguished Service Cross.

Battle

Landings 

The assault force was carried in ten landing craft, with another two carrying supplies and four DUKW amphibious trucks carrying the  ladders requisitioned from the London Fire Brigade. One landing craft carrying troops sank, drowning all but one of its occupants; another was swamped. One supply craft sank and the other put the stores overboard to stay afloat. German fire sank one of the DUKWs. Once within a mile of the shore, German mortars and machine guns fired on the craft.

These initial setbacks resulted in a 40-minute delay in landing at the base of the cliffs, but British landing craft carrying the Rangers finally reached the base of the cliffs at 7:10am with approximately half the force it started out with. The landing craft were fitted with rocket launchers to fire grapnels and ropes up the cliffs. As the Rangers scaled the cliffs, the Allied ships USS Texas (BB-35), USS Satterlee (DD-626), USS Ellyson (DD-454), and HMS Talybont (L18) provided them with fire support and ensured that the German defenders above could not fire down on the assaulting troops. The cliffs proved to be higher than the ladders could reach.

Attack
The original plans had also called for an additional, larger Ranger force of eight companies (Companies A and B of the 2nd Ranger Battalion and the entire 5th Ranger Battalion) to follow the first attack, if successful. Flares from the cliff tops were to signal this second wave to join the attack, but because of the delayed landing, the signal came too late, and the other Rangers landed on Omaha instead of Pointe du Hoc. The added impetus these 500 plus Rangers provided on the stalled Omaha Beach landing has been conjectured to have averted a disastrous failure there, since they carried the assault beyond the beach, into the overlooking bluffs and outflanked the German defenses.

When the Rangers made it to the top at Pointe du Hoc, they had sustained 15 casualties. "Ranger casualties on the beach totalled about 15, most of them from the raking fire to their left". The force also found that their radios were ineffective.  Upon reaching the fortifications, most of the Rangers learned for the first time that the main objective of the assault, the artillery battery, had been removed. The Rangers regrouped at the top of the cliffs, and a small patrol went off in search of the guns. Two different patrols found five of the six guns nearby (the sixth was being fixed elsewhere) and destroyed their firing mechanisms with thermite grenades.

Leonard Lomell of the 2nd Ranger Battalion maintained that he and Ranger Jack Kuhn found the guns completely by accident after walking down a tree-lined lane, whilst on patrol.

Multiple copies of the Rangers orders were released in 2012 by the US National Archives, indicating that Lt. Col. Rudder had been told of the guns' removal prior to landing. His D-Day orders went beyond the taking of Pointe du Hoc and remained consistent: Land at Pointe du Hoc & Omaha Beach; advance along the coast; take the town of Grandcamp, attack the Maisy Batteries and reach the "D-Day Phase Line" (close to Osmanville) two hours before dark. The Rangers could then repel counterattacks along the Grandcamp-Vierville road, via the Isigny-Bayeux road or diagonally across open fields. They could also prevent mobile 150mm artillery getting within a 12-mile range of the beachhead.

The Rangers trained specifically for the 12-mile inland march during the Slapton Sands exercises in England, and the First Infantry Division was also given the same "D-Day Phase Line" objective.

Once captured, Pointe du Hoc did not result in any observational disadvantage for the German Army as they already used the taller Chateau, houses and churches in the area.

The Small Unit Actions Report written by US Army Intelligence, states that there were times (some hours) when the Rangers did not see a single German after the initial fighting.  Historians suggest this gave Lt. Col. Rudder the time to have continued with his objectives.  No documentary evidence has been produced ordering Rudder to stay and "guard the road" behind Pointe du Hoc or wait for reinforcements. Yet that version of events is often stated as factual in books written prior to 2012.

German counter-attacks
The costliest part of the battle for Pointe du Hoc for the Rangers came after the successful cliff assault. Determined to hold the vital high ground, yet isolated from other Allied forces, the Rangers fended off several counter-attacks from the German 914th Grenadier Regiment. The 5th Ranger Battalion and elements of the 116th Infantry Regiment headed towards Pointe du Hoc from Omaha Beach. However, only twenty-three Rangers from the 5th were able to link up with the 2nd Rangers during the evening of 6 June 1944. During the night the Germans forced the Rangers into a smaller enclave along the cliff, and some were taken prisoner.

It was not until the morning of 8 June that the Rangers at Pointe du Hoc were finally relieved by the 2nd and 5th Rangers, plus the 1st Battalion of the 116th Infantry, accompanied by tanks from the 743rd Tank Battalion.

When the Rangers began suffering heavy losses, brief consideration was given to sending in the 84-man Marine Detachment aboard the battleship U.S.S. Texas on the morning of 7 June. At the last minute, word was passed down through the Army chain of command that no Marines would be allowed to go ashore, not even providing armed escort on landing craft ferrying Army troops or supplies.

Aftermath

At the end of the two-day action, the initial Ranger landing force of 225+ was reduced to about 90 fighting men. In the aftermath of the battle, some Rangers became convinced that French civilians had taken part in the fighting on the German side. A number of French civilians accused of shooting at American forces or of serving as artillery observers for the Germans were executed.

Timeline

6 June 1944

06.39 – H-Hour – D, E and F companies of 2nd Ranger Battalion approach the Normandy coast in a flotilla of twelve craft.
07.05 – Strong tides and navigation errors mean the initial assault arrives late and the 5th Ranger Battalion as well A and B companies from 2nd Battalion move to Omaha Beach instead.
07.30 – Rangers fight their way up the cliff and reach the top and start engaging the Germans across the battery. Rangers discover the casemates are empty.
08.15 – Approximately 35 Rangers reach the road and create a roadblock.
09.00 – Five German guns are located and destroyed using thermite grenades.

For the rest of the day the Rangers repel several German counter-attacks.
During the evening, one patrol from the 5th Rangers that landed at Omaha beach make it through to join the Rangers at Pointe du Hoc.

7 June 1944
The Rangers continue to defend an even smaller area on Pointe du Hoc against German counter-attacks.
Afternoon – A platoon of Rangers arrives on an LST, with wounded removed.

8 June 1944
Morning – The Rangers are relieved by troops arriving from Omaha Beach.

Commemoration

Pointe du Hoc now features a memorial and museum dedicated to the battle. Many of the original fortifications have been left in place and the site remains speckled with a number of bomb craters. On 11 January 1979 this 13-hectare field was transferred to American control, and the American Battle Monuments Commission was made responsible for its maintenance.

Notes

References

Further reading

External links

 History and photos of the Pointe du Hoc D-Day – Overlord
 Author Interview, November 15, 2012 Pritzker Military Library
 American D-Day: Omaha Beach, Utah Beach & Pointe du Hoc
 D-Day – Etat des Lieux: Pointe du Hoc
 President Reagan's speech at the 40th anniversary commemoration
 Ranger Monument on the American Battle Monuments Commission web site
 The World War II US Army Rangers celebrate the 50th Anniversary of D-Day
 Migraction.net: seawatching at Pointe du Hoc – for visitors interested in sea birds at this site
 Royal Marines Supporting the Rangers at Pointe Du Hoc

Operation Overlord
Operation Neptune
Battles of World War II involving the United States
United States Army Rangers
Military operations of World War II involving Germany
Conflicts in 1944
Atlantic Wall
World War II sites of Nazi Germany
World War II sites in France
Coastal fortifications
Nazi architecture
World War II defensive lines